Astrid Krag (born 17 November 1982 in Vejle) is a Danish politician, who is a member of the Folketing for the Social Democrats political party. She served as the Minister of Social Affairs and the Interior in the Cabinet of Mette Frederiksen. She previously served as Minister of Health and Prevention in the Cabinet of Helle Thorning-Schmidt from October 2011 until January 2014. 

She was a part of the SF youth movement since her high school years at Tørring Amtsgymnasium. She studied Political Science at the University of Copenhagen from 2003 to 2007, and in November 2007 she was elected to parliament. She lives on Amager, is married to musician Andreas Seebach with whom she has a daughter and a son.

Political career
She was elected to the Danish Parliament in 2007. During her time as a member of parliament she was spokesperson for the Socialist People's Party on the topics of immigration, citizenship and elder care. She has been noted as a supporter of a somewhat stricter immigration policy, than the party has previously pursued.

She had been described as a member of the party's right wing, but described herself as a "reform socialist", in the pragmatic center of the party. When leader of the Socialist People's Party Villy Søvndal announced that he would step down in September 2012, she announced her candidacy as new leader, and garnered supporting statements from most of the party top. Her opponent in the bid for party leadership was Annette Vilhelmsen, of the party's left wing, who won with 64% percent of the votes.

In January 2014 as the Socialist People's Party left the government coalition, Astrid Krag left the People's party to become a member of the ruling Social Democratic Party.

On 27 June 2019, she became Minister of Social Affairs and the Interior in the Frederiksen Cabinet.

References

External links 
 Biography on the website of the Danish Parliament (Folketinget)

|-

|-

|-

1982 births
Living people
People from Vejle Municipality
Socialist People's Party (Denmark) politicians
Social Democrats (Denmark) politicians
21st-century Danish women politicians
University of Copenhagen alumni
Government ministers of Denmark
Women government ministers of Denmark
Danish Health Ministers
Female interior ministers
Danish Interior Ministers
Women members of the Folketing
Members of the Folketing 2007–2011
Members of the Folketing 2011–2015
Members of the Folketing 2015–2019
Members of the Folketing 2019–2022
Members of the Folketing 2022–2026